The Ritchie Boys were a special collection of soldiers, with sizable numbers of German-Austrian recruits, of Military Intelligence Service officers and enlisted men of World War II who were trained at Camp Ritchie in Washington County, Maryland. Many of them were German-speaking immigrants to the United States, often Jews, who fled Nazi persecution. They were used primarily for interrogation of prisoners on the front lines and counter-intelligence in Europe because of their knowledge of the German language and culture. They were also involved in the Nuremberg trials as prosecutors and translators.

Camp Ritchie 
The Ritchie Boys consisted of approximately 20,000 servicemen, and 200 Women's Army Corps members who were trained for U.S. Army Intelligence during WWII at the secret Camp Ritchie training facility.  Approximately 14%, or 2,200, of them were Jewish refugees born in Germany and Austria. Most of the men sent to Camp Ritchie for training were assigned there because of fluency in German, French, Italian, Polish, or other languages needed by the US Army during WWII.  They had been drafted into or volunteered to join the United States Army and when their ability to speak the language of an enemy was discovered, they were sent to Camp Ritchie on secret orders.  Some of the Jewish refugees who were part of this program had originally arrived in the US as children, many without their parents, and were also among the One Thousand Children. (One such OTC was Ambassador Richard Schifter.)

They were trained at the Military Intelligence Training Center at Camp Ritchie in Maryland, later officially known as Fort Ritchie, and closed in 1998 under the 1995 Base Realignment and Closure Commission. They were specially trained in methods of intelligence, counterintelligence, interrogation, investigation and psychological warfare, 900 of these men also attended special training at Camp Sharpe, Pennsylvania. The Jewish refugees were qualified for these tasks because they knew the German language and understood the German mentality and behavior better than most American-born soldiers. The role of these soldiers was therefore to work in the front lines, at strategic corps and army levels, at interrogation, analyzing German forces and plans, and also to study and demoralize the enemy. The majority of them went on to work as members of the US Counter Intelligence Corps.

During the Battle of the Bulge, two Ritchie Boys were recognized due to their accents, after which German officer Curt Bruns ordered them both to be summarily executed, saying "The Jews have no right to live in Germany." Bruns was arrested, tried, and executed for these murders on June 15, 1945."

Europe
After the German declaration of war against the United States on December 11, 1941, the Ritchie Boys became an important weapon for the Allies. Many of them entered Europe on D-Day, 6 June 1944. Others followed over time. Shortly after reaching land, they left their units and pursued their special tasks. They were able to feed the Allies valuable information. Gen. Oscar Koch (Gen. Patton's G-2) acknowledged that the advance warning of the German Bulge offensive was made possible by information gathered by their MIS units. Moreover, the Ritchie Boys helped break German resistance by demoralizing them in both open and covert operations. They interrogated POWs and defectors to obtain information about German force levels, troop movements, and the physical and psychological state of the Germans. A common interrogation tactic was to use the Germans' fear of transfer into Soviet custody. By means of targeted disinformation via newspaper announcements, flyers, radio broadcasts, and sound trucks, the German population and military were encouraged to cease their resistance to the Allied invasion.

Pacific
Ritchie pulled in over five hundred Japanese Nisei for the PACMIRS program (Pacific Military Intelligence Research Service) to translate captured documents the U.S. Navy captured in Saipan. Fifteen crates of documents were sent to Camp Ritchie for training purposes and were not considered to have any military intelligence. One Nisei, Kazuo Yamane, dug into a crate, retrieving what he believed to be a textbook, but soon discovered it to be meeting minutes from a gathering of all of Japans armories. The notes contained locations of the armories, the number of weapons held by Imperial Japan, spare parts held, and indicated that Japan had half the number of weapons available to them in 1944 as they did in 1943. Yamane immediately contacted his superior who contacted the War Department in translating the text into English which allowed the United States to take out the armories. Yamane called this act his "Proof of Loyalty" because he claimed he could have easily not reported the document to his superiors. A 2018 film, PROOF OF LOYALTY: Kazuo Yamane and the Nisei Soldiers of Hawaii detailed his time in the service and at Ritchie.

Post-war
A classified postwar report by the U.S. Army found that nearly 60 percent of the credible intelligence gathered in Europe came from the Ritchie Boys.

After the war, many of the Ritchie Boys served as translators and interrogators, some during the Nuremberg Trials. Many of them went on to successful political, scientific, or business careers.

The first-ever reunion of the Ritchie Boys took place from 23–25 July 2011 at the Holocaust Memorial Center in Farmington Hills, Michigan. Another reunion was held in June 2012 in Washington, D.C., and at Fort Ritchie, which by then had closed.

In August 2021 the Ritchie Boys were honored in a congressional resolution.

Following the sale of Fort Ritchie in April 2021, a museum and educational center is being planned to continue commemorating the story of the Ritchie Boys in the location where they originally trained. On April 25, 2022, Maryland State Senator Paul Corderman officially announced $400,000 of state funding for the creation of a museum at Camp Ritchie to honor the legacy of the Ritchie Boys and the history of the Army Post.

The Ritchie Boys were honored by the United States Holocaust Memorial Museum with the Elie Wiesel Award, the museum's highest honor to recognize "the unique role they played serving the United States and advancing our victory over Germany". Ritchie Boys Arno Mayer and Gideon Kantor were present to accept the award while a keynote speech was given by Mark Milley.

On October 31, 2022, a press conference was held at Fort Ritchie and Congressman David Trone announced he expected to introduce in Congress a bill to award the Ritchie Boys the Congressional Gold Medal.

Notable Ritchie Boys

Anyone who attended Camp Ritchie is considered a Ritchie Boy for this list, whether or not they went on to serve in Europe.
 

Instructors at Camp Ritchie included Rex Applegate and professional wrestler Man Mountain Dean.

Film and TV
In 2004, the documentary movie The Ritchie Boys by Christian Bauer featured ten of the Ritchie Boys.

On May 9, 2021, the story of the Ritchie Boys was presented in a forty-minute segment of the CBS news show 60 Minutes. Victor Brombert, 97, Paul Fairbrook, 98, and Guy Stern, 99, gave personal testimony. On January 2, 2022, an expanded one hour version called "60 Minutes Presents" was shown. The program re-aired on July 3, 2022, due to its popularity

See also 
 P. O. Box 1142, codename for MIS special wing, MIS-Y, POW interrogation, at Fort Hunt, Virginia

References

Bibliography 
 
 
 Book review:  
 Book review:

External links 
 
 
 

Cryptography organizations
Military intelligence
Military intelligence agencies
Defunct United States intelligence agencies
World War II espionage
Intelligence of World War II
Intelligence services of World War II
United States intelligence operations
Signals intelligence of World War II
United States Army Signals Intelligence Service
American propaganda during World War II
Psychological warfare
Military units and formations of the United States Army in World War II